Shyam Bhatia (born 1950) is an Indian-born British journalist, writer and war reporter based in London. He has reported from conflict zones such as the Middle East, Afghanistan and Sudan, and is a former diplomatic editor of The Observer. He has also served as US correspondent and Foreign Editor of the Bangalore-based Deccan Herald and Editor of Asian Affairs magazine in London.

Bhatia was educated at The Doon School in India and Leighton Park School in England before going to the University of Oxford. He is a columnist for the Indian Express. He has published several books based on his war reporting, and a political biography of the former Prime Minister of Pakistan, Benazir Bhutto (who was his contemporary at Oxford). In 1993, he won the Foreign Reporter of the Year for his coverage of the suffering of the Marsh Arabs in Southern Iraq. His May 2021 keynote interview about the spread of Covid with Dr Jerome Kim of the International Vaccine Institute was published by The Wire and broadcast on Youtube.

Bibliography

References

External links
 
 The Guardian profile

1950 births
Living people
People from Delhi
Indian male journalists
Alumni of the University of Oxford
Writers from Delhi
20th-century Indian writers
21st-century Indian writers
The Observer people
War correspondents
Indian Express Limited people
The Doon School alumni
People educated at Leighton Park School
British reporters and correspondents
Writers on the Middle East